Unwritten may refer to:

 Unwritten (album), 2004 album by Natasha Bedingfield
 "Unwritten" (song), song by Natasha Bedingfield from the album of the same name
 "Unwritten" (House), 2010 episode of TV series House
 Unwritten, 1977 art book by David Shapiro and Lucio Pozzi

See also
 The Unwritten, American comic book series
Unwritten rule